The 1904 Oregon Webfoots football team represented the University of Oregon in the 1904 college football season. It was the Webfoots' 11th season; they competed as an independent and were led by head coach Richard Shore Smith. They finished the season with a record of five wins and three losses (5–3).

Schedule

References

Oregon
Oregon Ducks football seasons
Oregon Webfoots football